Local elections were held in Denmark on 16 November 1993. 4703 municipal council members were elected to the 1994–1997 term of office in the 275 municipalities, as well as members of the 14 county councils of Denmark.

Results of regional elections
The results of the regional elections:

County councils

Municipal councils

References

1993
1993 elections in Denmark
November 1993 events in Europe